Kate Finster (born December 14, 2003) is an American pair skater. With her former skating partner, Balazs Nagy, she is the 2020 U.S. national junior champion, the 2019 U.S. national junior silver medalist, and the 2019 JGP Poland silver medalist.

Personal life 
Kate Finster was born on December 14, 2003 in Louisville, Kentucky to Jay and Stacey Finster. She has four siblings named Cameron, Chase, Maddie, and Caroline, and her older brother Chase also competes nationally in figure skating. Kate and Chase live together while training in Colorado Springs, Colorado. Finster's family owns three cats and three dogs. She enjoys playing water sports, long boarding, baking, cooking, spending time with friends, and going to the beach. Finster is an honor roll student who studies through Connections Academy.

Finster looks up to Alexa Scimeca Knierim / Chris Knierim and, when she was younger, Madeline Aaron / Max Settlage.

Career

Early career 
Finster began skating in 2008. She trained in singles with Jessica Mills Kincade in Louisville, Kentucky and in pairs with Delilah Sappenfield and John Coughlin in Colorado Springs, Colorado.

Finster teamed up with her first pairs partner, Joseph Goodpaster, at the age of 10. Together, they placed eighth at the 2014 U.S. Championships on the intermediate level. Finster paired with Eric Hartley for the next two seasons and won the 2015 U.S. national novice pairs title. She is the youngest skater to win the national novice pairs title. Finster then competed one season with Brandon Kozlowski, finishing tenth in the junior division at the 2017 U.S. Championships. She did not compete during the 2017–18 season.

Finster tried out with Balazs Nagy in the fall of 2017, around Thanksgiving, and they officially teamed up in early 2018. The pair relocated from training with Jessica Miller and Stephanie Miller in Northern Kentucky to work full-time with Sappenfield and Larry Ibarra in Colorado Springs.

2018–2019 season 
In their first season as a team, Finster / Nagy were assigned to 2018 JGP Czech Republic, where they finished ninth. They then won silver at Midwestern Sectionals. At the 2019 U.S. Championships, Finster / Nagy won the junior silver medal behind Laiken Lockley / Keenan Prochnow. As a result, they were named to the 2019 World Junior Championships team. At Junior Worlds, they were tenth after the short program and thirteenth in the free skating, to finish eleventh overall. Nagy called the experience "humbling" and motivation for the next season.

2019–2020 season 
Finster / Nagy opened the season with a sixth-place finish at 2019 JGP United States. They then won their first international medal at 2019 JGP Poland, earning the silver medal, behind Apollinariia Panfilova / Dmitry Rylov of Russia and ahead of Germany's Annika Hocke / Robert Kunkel. Their results qualified them as first alternates to the 2019–20 Junior Grand Prix Final.

Finster / Nagy won the inaugural U.S. Pairs Final to qualify to the 2020 U.S. Championships. They won their first junior pairs title at the 2020 U.S. Championships, ahead of Anastasiia Smirnova / Danil Siianytsia and Winter Deardorff / Mikhail Johnson. Their result earned them a berth on the 
2020 World Junior Championships team.

2020–2021 season 
Finster / Nagy placed ninth at the ISP Points Challenge.

In December, Nagy announced that the pair had split.

2021–2022 season 
Finster formed a new partnership with Dancing on Ice professional Matej Silecky. Finster/Silecky placed seventh in their debut appearance at the senior U.S. Championships.

Programs

With Nagy

Competitive highlights 
JGP: Junior Grand Prix

With Silecky

With Nagy

With Kozlowski

With Hartley

With Goodpaster

Detailed results

With Nagy

Junior results

References

External links 
 
 Kate Finster / Balazs Nagy at U.S. Figure Skating

2003 births
Living people
American female pair skaters
Sportspeople from Louisville, Kentucky
21st-century American women